Isabel Lohau (née Herttrich; born 17 March 1992) is a German badminton player, specializing in doubles play. She started playing badminton at her hometown Hersbruck in 2001, and in 2010 she joined the Germany national badminton team. She along with national team won the 2011 European Junior Championships and 2012 European Women's Team Championships. In the individual event, Lohau also won the bronze medals at the 2010 World Junior Championships in the mixed doubles, 2011 European Junior Championships in the mixed and girls' doubles, and at the 2018 and 2021 European Championships in the mixed doubles. She represented her country competing at the 2020 Summer Olympics.

Achievements

BWF World Championships 
Mixed doubles

European Championships 
Women's doubles

Mixed doubles

BWF World Junior Championships 
Mixed doubles

European Junior Championships 
Girls' doubles

Mixed doubles

BWF World Tour (3 titles, 4 runners-up) 
The BWF World Tour, which was announced on 19 March 2017 and implemented in 2018, is a series of elite badminton tournaments sanctioned by the Badminton World Federation (BWF). The BWF World Tour is divided into levels of World Tour Finals, Super 1000, Super 750, Super 500, Super 300 (part of the HSBC World Tour), and the BWF Tour Super 100.

Women's doubles

Mixed doubles

BWF Grand Prix (1 title) 
The BWF Grand Prix had two levels, the Grand Prix and Grand Prix Gold. It was a series of badminton tournaments sanctioned by the Badminton World Federation (BWF) and played between 2007 and 2017.

Mixed doubles

  BWF Grand Prix Gold tournament
  BWF Grand Prix tournament

BWF International Challenge/Series (7 titles, 7 runners-up) 
Women's doubles

Mixed doubles

  BWF International Challenge tournament
  BWF International Series tournament
  BWF Future Series tournament

References

External links 
 
 

1992 births
Living people
People from Hersbruck
Sportspeople from Middle Franconia
German female badminton players
Badminton players at the 2020 Summer Olympics
Olympic badminton players of Germany
Badminton players at the 2019 European Games
European Games competitors for Germany